Mutiny of the Worker Bees is a 2020 Mexican comedy drama film written and directed by Carlos Morett. The film stars Gustavo Egelhaaf, Alejandro Suárez and Bárbara de Regil in the lead roles. The film was released on 28 February 2020 and received poor reviews from critics. It was also streamed via Netflix on 20 May 2020.

Synopsis 
Omar (Gustavo Egelhaaf) is forced to obtain a job to earn a living in a tech company at Mexico City after his grandpa Abuelo (Alejandro Suárez) gets heart attack and Omar is in need to finance his grandpa's health, but Omar meets a quirky ensemble a nine to five job.

Cast 

 Gustavo Egelhaaf as Omar Buendía
 Alejandro Suárez as Abuelo
 Bárbara de Regil as Tonia Davich
 Mauricio Argüelles as Roberto Davich
 Cesar Rodriguez as Hugo Chances
 Fernando Becerril as Braulio
 José Sefami as Xavier Delgado

References

External links 

 
 

2020 films
2020s Spanish-language films
Mexican comedy-drama films
Spanish-language Netflix original films
Films shot in Mexico
2020 comedy-drama films
2020s Mexican films